Nuatali Josephine Nelmes is an Australian politician. She has been the Labor Lord Mayor of Newcastle since 15 November 2014, when she was elected in a by-election. Nelmes is the youngest Lord Mayor of Newcastle.

Nelmes studied a business degree in industrial relations and marketing at the University of Newcastle, and joined the Labor Party when she was 20. She was elected to the City of Newcastle council in 2008, succeeding her father, long-serving Labor councillor Paul Scobie. She was the Labor candidate for Lord Mayor at the 2012 election, and was endorsed by former state MP Jodi McKay, but was defeated by developer and conservative independent candidate Jeff McCloy. She stood for the Senate in the unwinnable fifth position on the Labor ticket at the 2013 federal election, and nominated for preselection for the 2014 Newcastle state by-election, losing to fellow councillor Tim Crakanthorp. She has also served as a member of the Labor Party's national policy forum.

In mid-2014, McCloy resigned as Lord Mayor after becoming involved in a corruption investigation into illegal donations to MPs in the region. Nelmes was again the Labor candidate at the resulting by-election, and was successful, receiving 42% of the vote to closest rival and conservative independent Brad Luke's 24%. Nelmes campaigned on restoring trust, protecting and improving services particularly public transport, Newcastle railway line, supports funding the Newcastle Art Gallery expansion, and urban renewal in the inner city. She has also supported a Newcastle bid for the 2030 Commonwealth Games. Nelmes is only the second female Lord Mayor of Newcastle after popular 1970s-era mayor Joy Cummings. Her victory also resulted in Labor taking control of the local, state and federal political offices in Newcastle for the first time since 1998.

Personal life

Nelmes is married with three children and lives in Merewether.

References

External links

Year of birth missing (living people)
Living people
Australian Labor Party mayors
Mayors and Lord Mayors of Newcastle
New South Wales local councillors
Place of birth missing (living people)
Women local councillors in Australia
Women mayors of places in New South Wales